The 1991 Langbaurgh on Tees Council election took place in May 1991 to elect members of Langbaurgh-on-Tees Council in England. The whole council was up for election under new boundaries and it would be the final election to Langbaurgh Borough Council, before it was replaced by Redcar and Cleveland Borough Council in 1995.

The Labour Party won the most seats and regained overall control of the council.

Election result

Ward Results

Belmont

Brotton

Coatham

Dormanstown

Eston

Grangetown

Guisborough

Hutton

Kirkleatham

Lockwood & Skinningrove

Loftus

Longbeck

Newcomen

Normanby

Ormesby

Redcar

Saltburn

Skelton

South Bank

St. Germains

Teesville

West Dyke

References

1991 English local elections
1991
1990s in North Yorkshire